Kolberg, or Kołobrzeg, is a town in Poland, until 1945 part of Germany.

Kolberg may also refer to:
 Kolberg (surname)
 Kolberg (film), a 1945 Nazi propaganda film
 SMS Kolberg, a German warship from World War I
 a district of Großkarolinenfeld, Bavaria, Germany
 Kolberg, Wisconsin, an unincorporated community in Door County, USA

See also 
 Colberg
 Kohlberg (disambiguation)